Dr. Paul Mooney was appointed President of National College of Ireland, based in North Wall, Dublin, in February 2007.  He holds  a Ph. D (Doctorate in Industrial Sociology), a Graduate Diploma (Industrial Relations), and a National Diploma in Industrial Relations and is a Fellow of the Chartered Institute of Personnel and Development.

Biography 
Mooney began his working life as a butcher in Dublin.  After completing a formal apprenticeship, he moved into production management. He subsequently joined General Electric and held a number of increasingly responsible Human Resource positions in manufacturing.

After G.E, Mooney worked with Sterling Drug in the start-up of their highly successful plant in Waterford.  Subsequently, as Human Resource Director for the Pacific Rim, he had responsibility for all personnel activity in South East Asia.

On his return to Ireland, Mooney established PMA Consulting (1991), a specialised organisation and management development consultancy.

Published works
Mooney is the author of eight books.  One, the "Badger Ruse", is a crime thriller set in Dublin, while the others cover a wide range of topics in the HR area.  The books include:
Developing the high performance organisation best practice for managers, Published in 1996, Oak Tree Press (Dublin) 
Developing the High Organisation, Publication Date: 1996
The Effective Consultant, Publisher: Oak Tree Press (27 May 1999) 
Keeping Your Best Staff : The Human Resources Challenge in a Competitive Environment, Publication Date: 1999, Abebooks.co.uk
Turbo-charging the HR Function, Publication Date: 1 Feb 2001, Easons 
Union-Free: Creating a Committed and Productive Workforce, Publication Date: 2005, The Liffey Press
The Badger Ruse, Publisher: Trafford Publishing (6 July 2006), Amazon
Desperate Executives, Publication Date: 2008,The Liffey Press

References

External links
National College of Ireland website

Alumni of the National College of Ireland
Year of birth missing (living people)
Living people
Presidents of the National College of Ireland